Berserk Warriors is a song by Australian band Mental As Anything, released in December 1981, through Regular Records. The song was written by band member Peter O'Doherty.  It is a thinly-veiled reference to the marital travails of the members of ABBA. It was released as the third and final single from the band's third album Cats & Dogs. The Song first charted on December 14, 1981, and it peaked at no. 30 on the Kent Music Report and it stayed in the charts for 16 weeks. The song Berserk Warriors was used in the 2010 movie Animal Kingdom.

Track listing

Personnel 
 Martin Plaza — lead vocals, guitar
 Greedy Smith — lead vocals, keyboards, harmonica
 Reg Mombassa — guitar, vocals
 Peter O'Doherty — bass, guitar, vocals
 Wayne de Lisle – drums

Charts

References 

Mental As Anything songs
1981 songs
1981 singles
Regular Records singles
Songs written by Peter O'Doherty
Norse mythology in music